Saint Bede Academy is a private, four-year, Catholic college-preparatory high school located in Peru, Illinois. The campus buildings and monastery are situated on 800 acres of wooded land. The monastery is home to 12 Benedictine monks who have taken a vow of stability, meaning that they remain at Saint Bede Abbey for their lifetimes. The monks take an active role in the affairs and administration of the academy.

The school is accredited by the State of Illinois, the North Central Association, and the Office of Catholic Education of the Roman Catholic Diocese of Peoria.

History
St. Bede Abbey and Academy were founded in 1890 by six monks tasked with establishing a Benedictine teaching institution where young men could receive a Catholic education. The school was dedicated on October 12, 1891 as an all-boys boarding school, remaining as such until 1973, at which time it became a coeducational institution.

In 1981, the boarding program ceased, and the former dormitory rooms were converted into additional class and office space. Prior to the boarding program's ending, it was not uncommon for parents to send their boys hundreds of miles to attend and live at St. Bede. Afterward, the Academy still drew a consistent number of students from the local area.

Due to interest from foreign students and alumni, St. Bede resumed its boarding program in 2007. 10% of the student population consists of boarding students. Currently, St. Bede houses male and female boarders in separate houses located on-campus. Both houses operate under the care of a married couple who live with and supervise the boarders.

The original school building is still in use. It has undergone numerous renovations since it was built over one hundred years ago. In 2018 the Perino Science Center was constructed as an addition to the north face of the Academy.  The PSC is a 17,000 square foot STEM center that rivals similar science facilities found at quality universities.  The school's continued maintenance and capital development has always depended heavily on the monetary contributions of its over-7000 alumni and other donors. The school operates several fundraising events such as an annual auction and phone-a-thon to help bridge the difference between tuition and actual operating costs.

Academic life
The school operates on a fixed daily schedule of eight periods of forty-three minutes. Students are required to enroll in seven courses per semester. The school year is divided into two 18-week semesters. Additionally, students must garner at least 25 academic credits to graduate, as well as complete 25 hours of service work per academic year.

Student profile
The student population is made up of approximately 300 students with a student-faculty ratio of 9:1 and an average class size of 16:5. Approximately 99% of graduates go on to attend a post-secondary institution.

Athletics
St. Bede competes in the Three Rivers Conference for all sports. Beginning in 2023-24 school year, St. Bede will compete in the  Tri-County Conference for all sports except football, which will compete in the newly formed Chicago Prairie Conference.  

Boys sports:
Baseball,
Basketball,
Bowling,
Cross Country,
Football,
Golf,
Swimming,
Tennis,
Track,
Weightlifting,
Wrestling.

Girls sports:
Basketball,
Bowling,
Cheerleading,
Cross Country,
Golf,
Softball,
Swimming,
Tennis,
Track,
Volleyball,
Weightlifting.

Clubs and activities

Abbey Mass Servers
Band
Band
Bass Fishing
Caedmon Literary Magazine editors
Car Club
Chorus
Extraordinary ministers of Holy Communion
Fall Theater
Heritage Club
Homecoming Variety Show
Interact Club
Last Supper Club
Musical
Pep Club
Prom Committee
Stage Rats
Student Government
Scholastic Bowl
Spring Musical
Student Ambassadors
Technology Club
Yearbook Club
 Interact Club
Venturing Club

Campus

The 800 acre St. Bede campus includes the school, its attached monastery, a church, a football field with stands, a baseball field with stands, a basketball stadium/theater, an outdoor 400 meter track, a soccer field, the Saint Bede Abbey Press building, the boarding houses, and much open space, including an apple orchard, as well as corn and soybean fields.

Facility
The school is a five-level brick building with dozens of classrooms and offices. The building can be perceived in halves, with the north half containing most of the classrooms and the south half containing most of the offices.

The main administrative office is located on the first floor. There are computer labs on the first and second floors. The art department takes up most of the third floor. The science labs and classrooms are located in the Perino Science Center. Lockers are located on the second and third levels of the building. There is a tunnel that connects the main building with the gym, where physical education classes are held.

Saint Bede Abbey
St. Bede Abbey, attached to the school, is the permanent residence of twelve monks who live according to the Rule of Saint Benedict. The monks, many of whom actively participate in the everyday workings of the school, follow the gospel of Christ by serving God, the Church, and the community through daily prayer, both communal and private, serious work, quiet reflection, hospitality, and the renunciation of marriage, possessions, and pleasure.

The Abbey, like the Academy,  was founded in 1890 by a group of six monks who were sent from St. Vincent Archabbey in Latrobe, Pennsylvania to spread the Benedictine tradition. By 1910, the community of monks had grown large enough to become independent from St. Vincent's and thus elected their first abbot. The population of monks peaked in the middle of the twentieth century, and has since declined to its current population of 32.

The current abbot is Philip Davey, OSB, who succeeded former abbot Claude Peifer, OSB, in June 2011. Abbot Peifer, likewise, succeeded Abbot Roger Corpus, OSB, in 2003.

Abbey Church
The Abbey Church is a multi-purpose building containing a general assembly area, students' chapel, theater/lecture hall, lounge, kitchenette, and conference rooms. The students use the Abbey Church for Eucharistic liturgies, prayer services, penance services, classes, plays, and meetings.

Library
The St. Bede Academy library is a multilevel facility consisting of two large reading rooms on two levels joined by four levels of stacks. The theology library consists of the upper reading room and the top level of the stacks. The academy library consists of the lower reading room and three levels of stacks. The academy collection totals 20,000 volumes and the monastery collection contains 19,000 volumes.

Student refectory
The student refectory, located on the main floor of the school building, provides hot lunch and snack items daily to students. Students remain on campus during lunchtime. The refectory was renovated during the summer of 1997 to restore the original tin ceiling which had been covered over for years. Ceiling fan/light fixtures now hang to provide an atmosphere of former days at the Academy.  A commons area located in the Perino Science Center is a gathering place for students where students go to meet socially, study. etc.  Refreshments are always available in the PSC vending area.

Notable alumni

Andrew J. Bacevich- Professor Boston U. and Johns Hopkins, Author and Historian, Princeton-West-Point
J. A. Happ, Pitcher - New York Yankees, Northwestern University
James Massey - Professor at University of Notre Dame, MIT and ETH Zurich

References

External links
Saint Bede Academy
Saint Bede Abbey

Benedictine secondary schools
Educational institutions established in 1890
Roman Catholic Diocese of Peoria
Catholic secondary schools in Illinois
Schools in LaSalle County, Illinois
Boarding schools in Illinois
Catholic boarding schools in the United States
Peru, Illinois
1890 establishments in Illinois